Ora is an unincorporated community in Fresno County, California, United States.

References

Unincorporated communities in California
Unincorporated communities in Fresno County, California